Michael Hagberg (born 1954) is a Swedish social democratic politician who was a member of the Riksdag from 1994 to 2010.

References
Michael Hagberg (S)

1954 births
Living people
Members of the Riksdag from the Social Democrats
Members of the Riksdag 2002–2006
Place of birth missing (living people)
Date of birth missing (living people)
Members of the Riksdag 1994–1998
Members of the Riksdag 1998–2002
Members of the Riksdag 2006–2010